Yes! PreCure 5 is the fourth Pretty Cure anime television series produced by Toei Animation. The story is about a group of five girls who have the ability to transform into Pretty Cure. They have been given this ability in order to collect the fifty-five Pinkies spread across the land and save the Palmier Kingdom. The series began airing in Japan from February 4, 2007 and January 27, 2008, replacing Futari wa Pretty Cure Splash★Star in its initial timeslot and was replaced by its direct sequel series Yes! PreCure 5 GoGo!. The series uses three pieces of theme music, one opening and two ending themes. The opening theme is "PreCure 5, Smile Go Go!" (プリキュア5、スマイル go go! Purikyua Faibu, Sumairu gō gō?) performed by Mayu Kudou (Voice of Fairy Tone from Suite PreCure) with the chorus performed by Young Fresh with Mayumi+Yuka. From episode 1-32, the ending theme is "Kirakira-shichatte My True Love!" (キラキラしちゃってMy True Love! Kirakira-shicatte Mai Turū Rabu?, "Sparkle Brilliantly My True Love!") performed by Kanako Miyamoto (The Voice of Makoto Kenzaki/Cure Sword from Dokidoki! PreCure). From episode 33-49, the ending theme was changed to "Ganbalance de Dance ~Yumemiri Kiseki-tachi~" (ガンバランス de ダンス～夢みる奇跡たち～ Ganbaransu de Dansu ~Yumemiru Kiseki-tachi~"?), performed by Miyamoto with the PreCure 5. This song was also used as the theme for the film adaptation Great Miraculous Adventure in the Mirror Kingdom!. An insert song in the series titled "Tobikkiri! Yūki no Door" (とびっきり!勇気の扉（ドア） Tobikkiri! Yūki no Doa?, "Extraordinary! The Door of Courage") was performed by Mariya Ise as her character Urara Kasugano and was used in episodes 20 and 29.


Episode list

See also
Yes! PreCure 5 the Movie: Great Miraculous Adventure in the Mirror Kingdom! - An animated film based on the series.

References 

2007 Japanese television seasons
2008 Japanese television seasons
Pretty Cure episode lists

es:Anexo:Episodios de Futari wa Pretty Cure